Bob, Rob,  or Robert Quinn may refer to:

Sportspeople
 Bob Quinn (American football) (born c. 1976), National Football League executive
 Bob Quinn (Australian footballer) (1915–2008), former Australian rules footballer with Port Adelaide in the SANFL
 Bob Quinn (baseball, born 1870) (1870–1954), American baseball executive
 Bob Quinn (baseball, born 1936), American baseball executive (and grandson of the above)
 Rob Quinn (born 1976), English footballer
 Robert Quinn (American football) (born 1990), American football defensive end

Other uses
 Bob Quinn (Australian politician) (born 1947), Australian politician
 Bob Quinn (filmmaker) (born 1935), Irish filmmaker, writer and photographer
 Bob Quinn Lake Airport, British Columbia, Canada
 Robert E. Quinn (1894–1975), American politician from Rhode Island
 Robert H. Quinn (1928–2014), American politician from Massachusetts, active 1950s–1980s

See also
 Robert Quine (1942–2004), American guitarist